Govindapoor is a village and panchayat in Ranga Reddy district, AP, India. It falls under Parigi mandal.

References

Villages in Ranga Reddy district